Two ships of the United States Navy have been named USS Dorchester:

 , a schooner in commission as a patrol vessel from 1917 to 1918
 , a barracks ship in commission from 1945 to 1946

See also
 , a War Shipping Administration troop transport famous for the "Four Chaplains" incident, converted from civilian cruise ship SS Dorchester

United States Navy ship names